John Friend (born 24 February 1953) is a former  Australian rules footballer who played with Geelong in the Victorian Football League (VFL).

Notes

External links 

Living people
1953 births
Australian rules footballers from Victoria (Australia)
Geelong Football Club players